WE Charity, formerly known as Free the Children, is an international development charity and youth empowerment movement founded in 1995 by human rights advocates Marc and Craig Kielburger. The organization implemented development programs in Asia, Africa and Latin America, focusing on education, water, health, food and economic opportunity. It also runs domestic programming for young people in Canada, the US and UK, promoting corporate-sponsored service learning and active citizenship. Charity Intelligence, a registered Canadian charity that rates over 750 Canadian charities, rates the "demonstrated impact" per dollar of We Charity as "Low" and has issued a "Donor Advisory" due to We Charity replacing most of its board of directors in 2020.

We Charity is related to other ventures from the Kielburgers, including the for-profit Me to We, which was the title of a 2004 book by Craig and Marc Kielburger, and We Day, a series of large-scale motivational events held in 17 cities throughout the school year.

A scandal arose when the charity was selected by the Canadian federal government in 2020 for a $43.53 million contract to oversee $900 million for the Canada Student Service Grant, but the decision was reversed after ties between the organization and the Trudeau family, including payments to Justin Trudeau's wife, brother, and mother, as well as the family of former Finance Minister Bill Morneau, were called into question.

On 9 September 2020, We Charity announced that it was winding down its operations in Canada and selling its assets to establish an endowment that will help sustain ongoing We Charity projects around the world. The announcement also explains that the existing board of directors, the existing Canadian employees, and the Kielburgers would leave We Charity Canada.

In November 2020, a Wikipedia investigation found the Wikipedia article for the WE Charity was illicitly modified by "paid agents who used deceptive online identities" from Israeli online reputation management service Percepto. The Chief Operations Officer for WE Charity, Scott Baker, denied involvement with the sockpuppetry and Percepto declined to comment.

In November 2021, CBC News reported that the WE Charity misled donors about the school they built in Kenya. "Far fewer schools were built than were funded by donors, a fact that leaked internal WE documents show was co-ordinated at the highest levels of the organization." WE Charity denied the report. CBC reported that, likely in a "co-ordinated campaign", a large number of groups and individuals wrote letters and emails discouraging them from reporting the story in the months leading up to its publication. The messages largely came from educators and charities, and included a full-page advertisement printed in several newspapers in September that argued that the news report was not in the public interest.

On 8 February 2022, WE Charity filed a lawsuit against the CBC in the District of Columbia District Court, alleging defamation stemming from a November 2021 piece which claimed that WE Charity had misled donors who helped build schools in Kenya. WE Charity is represented in the case by New York-based law firm Boies Schiller Flexner.

History 

WE Charity (formerly Free the Children) was founded in 1995 by Craig Kielburger when he was 12 years old. Kielburger was reading through the Toronto Star before school one day when he came across an article about the murder of a 12-year-old Pakistani boy named Iqbal Masih, a former child factory worker in Pakistan's carpet trade who had spoken out against child labour and received death threats for his activism. According to Masih's account, he was sold by his parents to a factory at the age of 4 and worked there until he was 10, much of the time shackled to a loom. After the murder of Masih led to an international outcry, Pakistani police said that the killing was not connected to his anti-child labour activism.

One of the Free the Children's first actions was to collect 3,000 signatures on a petition to the prime minister of India, calling for the release of imprisoned child labour activist Kailash Satyarthi. The petition was sent in a shoe box wrapped in brown paper. Satyarthi was eventually released. After he was freed, Satyarthi said, "It was one of the most powerful actions taken on my behalf, and for me, definitely the most memorable." Shortly afterward, Kielburger spoke at the convention of the Ontario Federation of Labour, where union representatives pledged $150,000 for a rehabilitation centre in India. The Bal Ashram centre was built by Satyarthi.

In December 1995, Kielburger embarked on an eight-week tour of South Asia to meet child labourers and hear their stories first-hand. It was on that trip that Kielburger had a meeting with then-Canadian Prime Minister Jean Chrétien, in which Kielburger convinced Chrétien to take a public stand against child slavery. In 1999, he wrote Free the Children, a book detailing his trip to South Asia and the founding of his charity.

Free the Children initially fundraised for organizations that raided factories and freed children from forced labour situations. When it became clear that the rescued children were being resold by their impoverished families, the organization changed its approach and started building schools in Nicaragua, Kenya, Ecuador and India. The organization later evolved an international development model with projects related to education, water, health care, food security and income generation.

In 2007, at age 25, Craig Kielburger was inducted into the Order of Canada. the second-youngest Canadian ever to receive the honour. His brother Marc Kielburger was inducted into the Order of Canada in 2010. Ernst & Young and the Schwab Foundation for Social Entrepreneurship, a sister organization of the World Economic Forum, presented the 2008 Social Entrepreneur Of The Year award in Canada to the Kielburgers for their work with Free the Children.

Free the Children rebranded as WE Charity in 2016. The charity runs domestic programs for young people in Canada, the US and the UK, and international development programs in Africa, Asia and Latin America. In September 2017, the organization moved to a new headquarters in downtown Toronto, named "WE Global Learning Centre". The Centre features a theatre, broadcast studio, and an open concept design.

In March 2020, a significant proportion of the board of directors at WE Charity was abruptly replaced. WE Charity stated that this had been typical conduct, as the contracts had expired naturally, however it was later revealed that the positions were slated to end on August 31, not March.

Programs

Domestic
Students take part in activities such as food and clothing drives for the homeless, anti-bullying campaigns, and fundraisers to build water projects, and schools in countries where WE Charity works, including Kenya, India, and Ecuador. They also raise money for other organizations and causes, such as children's hospitals, the Terry Fox Run9, and women's shelters.

We Charity partners with the Martin Aboriginal Education Initiative to deliver the "We Stand Together" campaign, promoted as strengthening ties between Indigenous and non-Indigenous people in Canada by emphasizing Canadian Indigenous history in classrooms.

In August 2019, the federal government announced that it was giving $3 million to WE Social Entrepreneurs initiative, aiming to create 200 "youth-led enterprises" that address social issues at a community level.

International
In July 2019, the organization opened its first WE College in Narok County, Kenya. It offered a range of courses to girls of Maasai Mara community. The charity and Me to We formerly carried out activities including school construction and We Day in China. Its purported connection to the Government of China came under scrutiny during the broader government contract scandal, though the organization denied that any relationship existed.

WE Day

WE Charity holds an annual series of stadium-sized youth empowerment events called "WE Day", bringing together tens of thousands of students and educators as part of the yearlong WE Schools service learning program. WE Day has featured notable speakers, such as Al Gore, Elie Wiesel, Martin Luther King III, Kofi Annan, Prince Harry and Meghan Markle and performers, such as Demi Lovato, Selena Gomez, Lilly Singh, Jennifer Hudson, Liam Payne, Iskra Lawrence, and Naomi Campbell. Tickets are not purchased, but are instead earned by students through service in a local or a global cause. The first WE Day was staged in Toronto in October 2007. The program has since expanded into 17 cities, including London, Chicago, Seattle, and Los Angeles. As of 2020, WE Day has been scrapped "for the foreseeable future".

Me to We

In 2004, Craig and Marc Kielburger published Me to We: Finding Meaning in a Material World. The book included contributions from Oprah Winfrey, Archbishop Desmond Tutu and Dr. Jane Goodall, and outlined the tenets of the "ME to WE" philosophy, including the importance of community and the idea of service as a path to happiness.

In 2008, Kielburger co-founded ME to WE, a social enterprise that offers socially conscious products, leadership training and travel experiences. ME to WE donates a minimum half of its profits to its partner organization WE Charity, to support its operating costs and international development work and invests the other half back into growing the enterprise.

Governance and financials 
WE Charity is governed by separate Boards of Directors in Canada, the US and UK. The Canadian Board Chairwoman was Michelle Douglas, a Canadian human rights activist. She resigned in March 2020, at the same time as many other board members. Douglas has said publicly since that she resigned because of "concerning developments" at the charity. Board members are drawn from government, academia, business, media and charitable sectors.

Concerns have been raised about the blurred lines between We Charity and Me to We.  These blurred lines include both organizations having the same Chief Financial Officer.  According to Charity Intelligence, in 2019, We Charity transferred 7% of its revenue to Me to We, a magnitude of revenue transferred from a charity to a related for-profit company that Charity Intelligence has not seen with any other charities.  We Charity's response to these concerns is that over a 5-year period preceding 2020, even after excluding the value of services and in kind contributions, Me to We contributed a net of $1.3 million more than it received from We Charity.

Work culture 
Some former employees and volunteers of We Charity have criticized the way they were treated at the organization. Former employees have been prevented from speaking about the organization because of non-disclosure agreements and described being in a culture of fear when challenging internal decisions. In June 2020, Amanda Maitland, a former We Charity employee, said a speech she wrote for a We Schools tour in 2019 about her experiences as a black woman was edited without her approval by a group of mostly white staff members. Maitland said when she tried a few months later to speak up a staff meeting about problems within the organization, she was "aggressively" shut down by Marc Kielburger. In July 2020, Marc and Craig Kielburger apologized "unreservedly" to Maitland on their personal Instagram accounts. The Kielburgers said the editing of Maitland's speech "simply should not have happened." A petition that circulated in July 2020 called on We Charity to take specific anti-racist measures. WE Charity said in a statement to CBC News that it "stands firmly for inclusion, diversity and the equitable, open treatment of all."

Government contracts scandal

In 2020, the federal cabinet of Justin Trudeau selected WE to administer a payment program for the Canada Student Service Grant program, a $900 million volunteer program, for a contract worth $43.53 million. The decision raised questions about the charity's ties to the Trudeau family and potential conflicts of interest and why the federal public service could not administer the funds as part of their regular mandate. Prime Minister Trudeau defended the government's initial decision to have WE Charity administer the program, saying that the organization's networks across the country made it the right choice and WE Charity itself would not profit from the contract.

On July 3, Liberal Minister of Diversity and Inclusion and Youth, Bardish Chagger, announced that WE Charity would no longer be administering the Canada Student Service Grant program. That same day, the Ethics Commissioner announced an investigation into Trudeau and the decision to have WE Charity administer the summer student grant program. Later it was revealed that Trudeau's mother Margaret and brother Alexandre received $250,000 and $32,000, respectively, for speaking at WE events between 2016 and 2020. Two of the daughters of Minister of Finance Bill Morneau were also found to have worked in unrelated work for the charity, one in a paid contract position, and the other as an unpaid volunteer; Morneau did not recuse himself from the cabinet decision for the contract.

Opposition parties have called for a variety of actions including the release of documents related to the charity and for high-ranking Liberals to appear before Parliamentary committees; the Conservatives asked for an investigation by the RCMP. Since then, Michelle Douglas, the former chair of We Charity's board, the Kielburger brothers, Trudeau, and his chief of staff Katie Telford have all been scheduled to testify before the Finance Committee. On July 31, 2020, the Government of Ontario announced that it would not be renewing an unspecified existing contract the province had with the WE Charity.

In a detailed report released May 13, 2021, Ethics Commissioner Mario Dion ruled that WE Charity did not receive any preferential treatment from Prime Minister Justin Trudeau. Dion refuted the claim that WE Charity founders Craig and Marc Kielburger were friends with the Trudeau family, writing, "During the examination, I determined there was no friendship between Mr. Trudeau and the Kielburgers, nor was Mr. Trudeau involved in any discussions with them leading to the decisions."
He also ruled that Trudeau's wife Sophie's volunteer work for WE Charity did not constitute a conflict of interest, and that none of Trudeau's relatives could have personally benefited from the government's contracts with WE Charity.

References

External links 

 
 WE Charity misled donors about building schools in Kenya, records show —— The Fifth Estate, Canadian Broadcasting Corporation

 
Children's rights organizations
Development charities based in Canada
Youth-led organizations
Non-profit organizations based in Toronto
Youth organizations established in 1995
Child-related organizations in Canada
Charities based in Canada